Ronn Tomassoni (born March 1958) is a retired American ice hockey player and coach. Tomassoni was part of the coaching staff at Harvard for 17 years in various capacities and helped the team with its only national title in 1989.

Career
Ronn Tomassoni played for Rensselaer in the late 1970s, posting average numbers over four seasons. After graduating in 1980 Tomassoni continued his involvement with hockey by becoming an assistant coach for Bill Cleary at Harvard in 1982. Tomassoni's arrival coincided with the Crimson's return to prominence as they began to make the NCAA Tournament annually. As time went on Cleary began to rely on Tomassoni more heavily, promoting him to associate status and effectively turning over the recruiting responsibilities to him. Tomassoni was part of Harvard's national title team in 1989 and was named as head coach when Cleary became athletic director after the 1989-90 season.

The early years under Tomassoni were very good in Cambridge as Harvard won three consecutive regular season titles, an ECAC title and made it to the 1994 Frozen Four. After 1994, however, Tomassoni could not get Harvard to produce a winning season.  He shared Bill Cleary's disdain for developing NHL players, a fact which cost the Crimson many elite recruits, such as Chris Drury.  Tomassoni exalted "poise" in players on opposing teams, even as he made his own players walk on eggshells.  He went so far as to place a 1st team All-American on the 4th line in 1995.  The extent of his coaching was to demoralize many of his players, and shuffle lines.  In general, his players hated playing for him.  During his tenure, "Harvard hockey" felt like it was a bunch of chickens running around at full speed with their heads cut off.  He did little to develop any player who went there with the exception of one player from British Columbia who went on to be mediocre in the East Coast Hockey League. He even seemed to celebrate little failures of the players he did not like, and would use those failures, even if minor, to justify their lack of opportunity. It is inconceivable that this man actually coached hockey at the college level.  See the notated stories below: he got the job through a phone call alone.  He had a number of potential weapons in his toolshed; however, he simply did not coach players at all.  He strategized poorly. He did not coach. Players got worse by coming to Harvard.  They continued to come for the school, and in spite of him, which is a tragedy, and has to be considered the fault of Bill Cleary who allowed him the job.   Since Cleary was athletic director, Tomassoni held onto the job for five seasons before "deciding to resign" after the 1998–99 season. Tomassoni returned to his native Minnesota afterwards, settling in Duluth.

Career statistics

Head coaching record

References

External links

1958 births
Living people
Sportspeople from Eveleth, Minnesota
Ice hockey coaches from Minnesota
American men's ice hockey right wingers
RPI Engineers men's ice hockey players
American ice hockey coaches
Harvard Crimson men's ice hockey coaches
Ice hockey players from Minnesota